Maria Cristina Yu Garcia-Cruz (born September 26, 1987), professionally known as Maricris Garcia-Cruz, is a Filipina singer and actress. She came to prominence after winning the third season of Pinoy Pop Superstar. She is the Philippines' Divine Siren.

Early life and education
Maricris Garcia was born as Maria Cristina Yu Garcia on September 26, 1987, in Caloocan, Philippines. She studied tourism at the La Consolacion College in Caloocan.

Career
She first auditioned in Pinoy Pop Superstar year one, but did not become a finalist. Two years later, she won with her rendition of Barry Manilow's "One Voice" at the Grand Finale held in Araneta Coliseum. She was the 3rd Pinoy Pop Superstar champion. Her voice is distinctly similar to the Divine Diva Zsa Zsa Padilla's voice, so she has been given the title of the "Divine Princess".

Personal life
On December 16, 2016, Garcia married TJ Cruz. In May 2020, Garcia announced via Instagram that she is expecting her first child.

Discography

Albums
Pinoy Pop Superstar Year 3 Grand Contenders' Album
 Track 4: Beautiful Disaster (written by Rebecca Johnson & Matthew Wilder)
Mga Awit Kapuso (Best Of GMA TV Themes) Volume 4
 Track 5: Mahal Kita (written by Daniel Tan)
Mahal Kita
Pangako ng Kailanman

Singles
 Kahit Isang Saglit (revival from Martin Nievera)
 Bakit Ikaw Pa Rin (revival from Jaya)
 With You

Soundtracks
 Nang Dahil Sa Iyo (from Mga Mata ni Anghelita)
 Mahal Kita (from MariMar)
 Kung Sana Bukas (from Babangon Ako't Dudurugin Kita)
 Kung Alam Mo Lang (from Kakambal ni Eliana)
 Pinakamamahal (from The Borrowed Wife)
 Ibibigay Ko Ang Lahat (from The Half Sisters)
 Lihim (from Ang Lihim ni Annasandra)
 Nasaan (with Aicelle Santos) (from Beautiful Strangers)
 Iniibig Kita (from MariMar)
 Ako'y Mahalin (from Destiny Rose)
 Ako na Lang Ang Bibitaw (from koreanovela series Carmina)
 Magkaibang Mundo (with Ralph King) (from Magkaibang Mundo)
 Natatanging Pag-ibig (from Sinungaling Mong Puso)
 Di Malilimot (from Someone to Watch Over Me)
 Pangarap (from Legally Blind)
 Destiny originally sung by Lyn (from My Love from the Star)
 Huwag Kang Papatay (from Ika-5 Utos)
 Tao Lang (from Pamilya Roces)
 Ganito Ako (from Dragon Lady) Walang Ganti (from Bihag) Bakit Siya? (with Aicelle Santos) (from The Better Woman) Kahit Ganun Pa Man (from Magkaagaw) Bukas Ay Para Sa Akin (from Artikulo 247) Sagot Sa Dalangin ( from Abot-Kamay na Pangarap) Dito Ka Lang  (from in my Heart )

Filmography
Television

Contemporaries
Jona, Pinoy Pop Superstar Year 1's Grand WinnerBrenan Espartinez, Pinoy Pop Superstar Year 1's 1st Runner-upGerald Santos, Pinoy Pop Superstar Year 2's Grand WinnerAicelle Santos, Pinoy Pop Superstar Year 2's 1st Runner-upBryan Termulo, Pinoy Pop Superstar Year 3's 1st Runner-upAwards
 3rd Pinoy Pop Superstar Grand Champion (June 2007)
 Best New Female Recording Artist in 1st PMPC Star Awards for Music (October 29, 2009)

Trivia
She is a GMA Network and GMA Records contract star.
She sang Mahal Kita, one of Marimar's theme songs.
She sang the final station ID of Q-11, with Geoff Taylor until now defunct in 2011.
Her first music video was "Kahit Isang Saglit" in which Dennis Trillo appeared.
Her song Mahal Kita'' was originally sung by the Pinoy Pop Superstar Year 2 Grand Champion Gerald Santos and revived by Maricris Garcia and became the love theme of Marimar
She was part of a trio group named La Diva wherein her co-singers were Aicelle Santos, Jonalyn Viray.
The "La Diva" sang the Philippine National Anthem during the Pacquiao-Cotto fight last November 15, 2009.

References

External links 

 
 Maricris Garcia at Sparkle GMA Artist Center

1987 births
Living people
Filipino women pop singers
Filipino people of Chinese descent
People from Caloocan
People from Santa Maria, Bulacan
Participants in Philippine reality television series
Reality show winners
Mezzo-sopranos
Singers from Metro Manila
GMA Network personalities
GMA Music artists
Filipino television variety show hosts